The Expedition of Ali ibn Abi Talib, against the Banu Tai tribe, took place in August 630 AD, 9AH, second month, of the Islamic Calendar. to destroy the statue (idol) of the pagan deity al-Fuls (al-Qullus).

Banu Tai
The Banu Tai were a tribe divided between the profession of idolatry and Christianity.

The chief of the tribe was Hatim Tai, he came to prominence because of his generosity and he acquired fame as a great hero of Arabia at the time, according to the Encyclopedia of Islam. Hatim was succeeded by Adi, who tried to follow in the footsteps of his father. Adi was very religious.

Expedition
Muhammad sent Ali ibn Abi Talib with 150 men to destroy the statue (idol) of the pagan deity al-Fuls (al-Qullus), worshipped by the people of Banu Tai. 100 of the Muslim fighters were on camel and the rest were on horseback. Ali took with him a black flag, and a white banner. Adi bin Hatim (the chief of the tribe) escaped to Syria.

At dawn, Ali carried out a raid on the inhabitants and demolished the statue of al-Fuls (al-Qullus), and captured many camels and sheep as war booty. The Muslims also took a number of men, women and children as captives. One of the captives was Hatim Tai's (the former chief of the tribes) daughter. Adi bin Hatim (the chief of the tribe) escaped to Syria.

Inside the al-Qullus safe the Muslims found three swords and three pieces of armour. They then shared the spoils and left the best for Muhammad.

Aftermath
Upon arrival in Madinah, the sister of 'Adi bin Hatim begged Muhammad for mercy on her and said:

O Messenger of Allâh, my brother is absent and father is dead, and I am too old to render any service. Be beneficent to me so that Allâh may be bountiful to you.He said: "Who is your brother?" She said: "It is 'Adi bin Hatim.", and Muhammad replied: "Is he not the one who fled from Allâh and his Messenger?

Muhammad then went away from her. The next day she reiterated the same thing and received the same answer. A day later she said the same thing a third time, but this time she was given a horse to go looking for her brother.

Her brother came to Muhammad and a conversation took place. The Muslim scholar Ibn Qayyim Al-Jawziyya mentions the conversation and event in his book Zad al-Ma'ad as follows:

What makes you flee? Do you flee lest you should say there is no god but Allâh? Do you know any other god but Allâh?" "No" he said, then talked for a while. The Messenger of Allâh went on saying: "Certainly you flee so that you may not hear the statement saying 'Allâh is the Greatest.' Do you know anyone who is greater than Allâh?" "No" he said. "The Jews are those whose portion is wrath, and the Christians are those who have gone astray," the Prophet retorted. "I am a Muslim and I believe in one God (Allâh)." 'Adi finally proclaimed with a joyous face. The Prophet ordered him a residence with one of the Helpers. From that time he started calling at the Prophet in the mornings and in the evenings.

Adi then embraced Islam as was reappointed the chief of his tribe. The entire tribe then converted to Islam.

Islamic primary sources

The event is also mentioned by the Muslim Scholar Ibn Sa'd in his book "Kitab al-tabaqat al-kabir", as follows:

Ibn Sa'd also explains the aftermath of this event, and Adi ibn Hatim's conversion to Islam, he wrote:

The Muslim scholar, Saifur Rahman al Mubarakpuri, referenced a Hadith from Musnad Ahmad ibn Hanbal (a Hadith collection) in his biography of Muhammad the "Sealed Nectar". The contents of the Hadith were as follows:

See also
Military career of Muhammad
List of expeditions of Muhammad
Military career of Ali
Adnanites

References

630
Campaigns ordered by Muhammad